The 7th Infantry Regiment is a unit of the Argentine Army (Ejército Argentino)  based at Arana (La Plata), Buenos Aires Province, Argentina.
The unit's full official name is 7th "Coronel Conde" Mechanized Infantry Regiment, and it is part of the 1st Armored Brigade, 3rd Army Division.

The regiment fought in the South American wars of independence and in the Falklands War, as part of the 10th Brigade, during the battles of Mount Longdon and Wireless Ridge.

Origins

The 7th Regiment traces its origins back to November 1810. At that time, it was known as the Cochabamba Infantry Regiment in Bolivia, and comprised locals. The Mayor of Chuquisaca, Francisco Rivero, was designated its commanding officer, with the rank of colonel. In June 1811, the unit was renamed No. 7 Infantry Regiment, and had its baptism of fire on 20 June 1811 at Huaqui, under the command of Lieutenant-Colonel Bolaños. Given the scarcity of experienced officers and the lack of training among the infantry fighting the well-armed and disciplined Spanish-backed enemy, the 7th Regiment soldiers could not maintain their assigned positions and soon joined in the retreat of the Patriot forces with the unit being  disbanded in the aftermath of defeat. However, in 1812, it was officially announced that plans were in progress for the reformation the regiment with horseback grenadiers and supporting infantry recruited from the patriots residing in the Banda Oriental Province.

War of Independence

On 31 May 1813 the 7th Regiment was officially formed in Buenos Aires, under the command of Lieutenant-Colonel Toribio de Luzuriaga. Sent to Upper Peru in late 1814, it suffered heavy losses in the Second Battle of the Sipe Sipe fighting Spanish Royalist forces.

The combat unit was soon reformed and placed under the command of Lieutenant-Colonel Pedro Conde. On 19 January 1817, the companies of the regiment formed the vanguard of the patriot forces of General Soler. They crossed the Andes through the Paso de Los Patos, taking part in the Battles of Achupayas, Putaendo, Las Coimas and Guardia Vieja. El 12 February 1817, the formation played an important role in the victory obtained during the Battle of Chacabuco against Spanish backed forces. The combat companies were then placed under the command of General Bernardo O' Higgins, taking part in the liberation of southern Chile, fighting at the Battles of Gavilán, Carampague and Talcahuano. Durante the Second Battle of Cancha Rayada, the regiment held firm despite a surprise enemy counterattack.

The regiment later took part in the Liberation of Peru as part of the 1st Division under General Las Heras and later General Arenales.

Post-independence 

On 17 April 1917, the 7th Regiment boarded trains at Estación Muñiz taking them to their new home base of La Plata.

Falklands War 

In 1982, the Argentine Army was organised into five corps, with its tactical deployment built around twelve brigades. With their tanks, the 1st and 2nd Armoured Cavalry Brigades were not suitable for operations in the Falklands/Malvinas and the 6th and 8th Mountain Infantry Brigades and 11th Mechanized Infantry Brigades were facing Chile. The 3rd and 7th Jungle Infantry Brigades in the north were not equipped for cold weather operations and were facing Brazil and Uruguay. The 4th Airborne Infantry Brigade, which was the National Strategic Reserve, was deployed in Córdoba Province and the 10th Mechanized Infantry Brigade in Buenos Aires was entrusted with the defence of the Atlantic Littoral.

In the immediate aftermath of Operación Rosario, the Argentine Army High Command recommended that Brigadier-General Julio Fernández Torres' 4th Airborne Brigade and Brigadier-General Oscar Luis Jofré's 10th Mechanized Brigade be readied for possible deployment to the Falklands.

When Brigadier General Jofré was warned to take his 10th Brigade to the Malvinas, he ordered the 1982 intake of conscripts to be replaced by reservists. This was done by announcements on the radio, television, newspapers, phone calls, telegrams and home visits. Having heard and seen the wide coverage of the recuperation of the Falklands, most were more than willing to complete their military service, as demanded by Law 4.031 of the Servicio Militar Obligatorio by then-president Julio Argentino Roca, the military hero and statesman who conquered the Patagonia during the "Conquest of the Desert".

The recalled reservists had a year of training, comprising a solid 200 days in which the conscripts received relevant mentoring from their superiors
, that included the 7th 'Colonel Conde' Regiment fighting a mock battle in central Argentina alongside the 3rd 'General Belgrano' and 6th 'General Viamonte' Infantry Regiments of the 10th Brigade and tanks of the 1st Armoured Cavalry Brigade. They possessed fully automatic FN FAL rifles, FAP light machine guns and PAM sub-machine guns; these weapons delivered more firepower than the British L1A1 rifle (SLR). They were also equipped with FN MAG 7.62mm general-purpose machine guns, which were almost identical to those of the British Paras and Commandos. At their San Miguel del Monte training camp the 7th Regiment companies prepared for a possible war against Chile and carried out some helicopter drills with the 601st Combat Aviation Battalion. Some fifty conscripts and NCOs of the 7th Regiment were to fight more resolutely than the rest and passed on their skills, having been put through a commando course organized by commando-trained Major Oscar Ramón Jaimet, the Operations Officer of the 6th Infantry Regiment. Private Jorge Altieri in an interview after the war told how he trained hard with B Company:

I was issued with a FAL 7.62 millimetre rifle. Other guys were given FAP light machineguns and others got PAMs [submachine guns]. The main emphasis in shooting was making every bullet count. I was also shown how to use a bazooka, how to make and lay booby-traps, and how to navigate at night, and we went on helicopter drills, night and day attacks and ambushes.

The regiment was deployed to the Falkland Islands, where it fought in the battles for Mount Longdon and Wireless Ridge, sustaining 36 killed and 152 wounded and around 100 taken prisoner of war.

A British report in 1986 on the action on the western end of Longdon noted that "Some of them were very disciplined firing moving back into cover then coming out again and firing again or throwing grenades." Private Carlos Alberto Chiarlini would confirm this as part of his training in an Argentine documentary (Malvinas: La Guerra Que No Vimos, 1984): I was sleeping and then I started hearing shots. I got out of my position, there were tracers everywhere and shot after shot after shot. I looked ahead where the enemy was supposed to be coming from and everything that moved I shot at... I had to keep changing position because they saw me. I would shoot and they would see the flash of my rifle. I couldn't stay there long because they would pinpoint me and I would be in great danger. So I kept changing positions. 

During the close-quarter fighting, some British paratroopers reported hearing the Argentine defenders on Wireless Ridge use the 'wise-guy' talk adopted from 1930s Hollywood gangster movies.

On the night of 16 June, a fight broke out involving the 7th Regiment and 3 PARA, which turned into a riot with the Argentinians setting fire to the Globe Store. However a company from 2 PARA soon rushed to the area and order was restored.

References

Notes

External links 
  El 7 de Infantería, un pedazo importante de la historia militar del país (Accessed 2018-03-23)

Regiments of Argentina
Argentine War of Independence
Military units and formations of Argentina in the Falklands War